Dearest is the eighth Korean-language EP by the South Korean band N.Flying. It was released by FNC Entertainment on October 17, 2022.

Background 
On September 28, 2022, it was announced that N.Flying was scheduled to release an album on October 17. The album served as the group's last comeback before the enlistment of their members, Cha Hun and Kim Jae-Hyun. On October 6, the track list for the album was released by the group. J.don was involved in writing and composing all six songs for the album. The title song for the album was "I Like You".

On October 17, the group released their album alongside with the music video of the lead single.

Track listing

Charts

References 

2022 EPs
FNC Entertainment EPs
Korean-language EPs